The 2008–09 UAE League season was the 34th edition of top level football in the United Arab Emirates and started on 19 September 2008 until 24 May 2009.

Al-Ahli clinched the championship on the last day of the season, one of the most exciting campaigns for a number of years and also qualified for the 2009 edition of the FIFA Club World Cup as the host representative.

Al-Shabbab ACD were defending champions from the 2007–08 campaign.

Emirates Club and Hatta were relegated from the previous season.
Ajman Club and Al Khaleej Club were promoted from the second level.

The winners of the league qualified for the 2009 edition of the FIFA Club World Cup as the host representative.

Clubs

Managerial changes

Standings

Top goalscorers
Source: goalzz.com

25 goals
 Fernando Baiano (Al Jazira)

13 goals
 Mohamed Omer (Al-Nasr)
 Mohamed Kader (Dhafra)

12 goals
 Anderson Barbosa (Sharjah)
 Godwin Attram (Al-Shaab)
 Pinga (Al Wahda)

11 goals
 Baré (Al-Ahli)

9 goals
 Faisal Khalil (Al-Ahli)
 Alexandre Oliveira (Al Wasl)
 Mehrzad Madanchi (Al-Nasr)
 Jorge Valdivia (Al Ain)

References

External links
UAE League Goalzz

UAE Pro League seasons
United
1